Keyaron James Fox , born January 24, 1982) is a former American football linebacker. He was drafted by the Kansas City Chiefs in the third round of the 2004 NFL Draft. He played college football at Georgia Institute of Technology (Georgia Tech).

Fox also played for the Pittsburgh Steelers, Washington Redskins, and Houston Texans. He won Super Bowl XLIII over the Arizona Cardinals during his tenure with the Steelers.

College career
He played in 45 games (35 starts) during his tenure at Georgia Tech and finished his career with 376 tackles, 9 sacks, 40 tackles for loss, one INT, two fumble recoveries, six forced fumbles, 14 passes defensed, and seven QB pressures. He majored in management.

Professional career

Kansas City Chiefs
Fox was originally selected by the Kansas City Chiefs in the third round (93rd overall) of the 2004 NFL Draft. In his rookie season he played 12 games and finished the campaign with 7 tackles. His second season with the Chiefs was low key as he only recorded three tackles. In 2006, Fox had a career-high season with 52 tackles and one sack. In his final year with the Chiefs, he played in ten games, recording 21 tackles.

Pittsburgh Steelers

On March 12, 2008 Fox signed with the Pittsburgh Steelers as a free agent. He recorded 17 tackles in 13 games in 2008 as the Steelers beat the Arizona Cardinals in Super Bowl XLIII.

An unrestricted free agent in the 2009 offseason, Fox was re-signed to a two-year, $1.8 million contract on April 6.

In week 6 of the 2009 season, Fox filled in for an injured Lawrence Timmons, where he intercepted a Brett Favre pass running it back for an 82-yard touchdown to help the Steelers secure a 27-17 victory over the undefeated Minnesota Vikings.

Fox was named the Steelers' special teams captain in 2009 and 2010.

Washington Redskins
On August 6, 2011, Fox signed with the Washington Redskins.

Houston Texans
On July 26, 2012, Fox signed with the Houston Texans. During training camp, he suffered a knee injury and was placed on the injured reserve list on August 9.

References

External links
Georgia Tech Yellow Jackets bio
Pittsburgh Steelers bio

1982 births
Living people
African-American players of American football
American football linebackers
Georgia Tech Yellow Jackets football players
Kansas City Chiefs players
Pittsburgh Steelers players
Players of American football from Atlanta
Washington Redskins players
Houston Texans players
21st-century African-American sportspeople
20th-century African-American people